The Aurelii Symmachi were an aristocratic senatorial family (gens) of the late Roman Empire.

The family received its first offices at the beginning of the 3rd century under emperor Septimius Severus. It further increased its prestige, reaching its peaks in the 4th and 5th centuries. Among the most important members of this family were:

 Aurelius Valerius Tullianus Symmachus, consul in 330
 Lucius Aurelius Avianius Symmachus, praefectus urbi in 364-365, son of Aurelius Valerius Tullianus Symmachus
 Quintus Aurelius Symmachus, c.340–c.402, orator, consul in 391. He was considered the best Latin orator of his age, similar to Cicero) by his contemporaries. He was the most influential of the Symmachi
 Quintus Fabius Memmius Symmachus, son of Quintus Aurelius Symmachus
 Aurelius Anicius Symmachus, nephew of Quintus Aurelius Symmachus
 Quintus Aurelius Symmachus the Younger, consul in 446, son of Quintus Fabius Memmius Symmachus 
 Quintus Aurelius Memmius Symmachus, consul in 485, son of Quintus Aurelius Symmachus the Younger
 Three daughters of Quintus Aurelius Memmius Symmachus: Saint Galla, Proba, and Rusticiana, the first wife of Boethius
 Anicius Manlius Severinus Boethius, adopted son of Quintus Aurelius Symmachus the Younger

The family had a noteworthy interest in literature, and its members were patrons, editors and historians.
 Lucius Aurelius Avianius Symmachus wrote a few epigrams on members of the Constantinian administration and another unknown literary work
 Quintus Aurelius Symmachus wrote many letters, edited in ten volumes, five orations, three panegyrics and 49 relations for his office, among which the most famous is the third, written in order to request the restoration of the Altar of Victory; in the last part of his life he dedicated himself to philology.
 Quintus Aurelius Symmachus (consul 446), to whom Ambrosius Theodosius Macrobius dedicated his De differentiis vel societatibus graeci latinique verbi.
 Quintus Aurelius Memmius Symmachus wrote a Roman History in seven books (now lost), which was used as a source by Jordanes for his Romana; he also helped the publication of the Commentarii in Somnium Scipionis by Ambrosius Theodosius Macrobius, even editing directly the work. Priscian dedicated him some of his works.

References

Bibliography 
 Arnold Hugh Martin Jones, John Robert Martindale, John Morris, "Q. Fabius Memmius Symmachus 10", The Prosopography of the Later Roman Empire, Cambridge University Press, 1971, pp. 1046-1047.
  John Martindale, John Morris, The Prosopography of the Later Roman Empire, vol. 2, Cambridge University Press, 1980, pp. 1044–1046.

 
Ancient Roman prosopographical lists
Roman stirpes